Dambisa Michelle Lunda  (born 10 September 1989), better known as just Dambisa is a Zambian singer-songwriter and a self-proclaimed queen of Dancehall. She is  also the brand ambassador for Pampers Zambia. She is best known for having some controversy in some of her songs which have put her in the spot-light. She has also featured on the front cover of EZM (Exclusive Zambian Magazine) Magazine in 2014 Dambisa debuted in 2011 with her hit single Kaduka Chain, on which she featured Petersen.

Early life and music career 
Dambisa started singing at the tender age of 9 years. During her teenage days, she would listen to Tina Turner’s songs and at times listened to PK Chishala’s which has now shaped her music career. After this Dambisa gained recognition in East, West and Southern Africa to performing on foreign shows and awards in Namibia. Her previous single African Baby was released in 2018 the song embraced the African culture and skin colour for people.

References 

Living people
1989 births
People from Lusaka
21st-century Zambian women singers